is a railway station on the Hisatsu Line in Kuma, Kumamoto, Japan, operated by Kyushu Railway Company (JR Kyushu).

Lines
Kyūsendō Station is served by the Hisatsu Line.

Adjacent stations

See also
 List of railway stations in Japan

External links

  

Railway stations in Kumamoto Prefecture